The Embassy of Iran in Moscow is the diplomatic mission of the Islamic Republic of Iran to the Russian Federation. The chancery is located at 7 Pokrovsky Boulevard in the Basmanny District of Moscow.

See also
 Iran–Russia relations
 Diplomatic missions in Russia

References

External links
 Ministry of Foreign Affairs of I.R. Iran

Iran–Russia relations
Iran
Moscow